Mr. Wright is the third studio album by American contemporary R&B singer Bernard Wright, released in 1985 via Manhattan Records. The album did not chart on the Billboard 200 but it peaked at #25 on the Billboard R&B chart. It was also Wright's last album to chart in the United States.

Three singles were released from the album: "Who Do You Love", "After You" and "Yo 'Nard". "Who Do You Love" was the most successful single from the album, peaking at #6 on the Billboard R&B singles chart in 1985.

Track listing

Personnel
Bernard Wright: Lead vocals, Keyboards, Synthesizers, Solo Guitar on "Too Damn Hot," backing vocals on various tracks, all instruments on tracks 8
Flare Funston: Drums, Percussion
Lenny White: Tymbales
Marcus Miller: Bass, Guitar on "Who Do You Love," Additional Synthesizers on "Just When I Thought You Were Mine"
Nick Moroch: Guitar
Yvonne Lewis: Backing vocals on "After You," "Love You So," "Too Damn Hot"
Marla Adler: Backing vocals on "After You," "Who Do You Love"
Lester Bell: Backing vocals on "After You"
Sybil Thomas: Backing vocals on "Love You So," "Too Damn Hot"
Dennis Collins: Backing vocals on "Love You So," "Too Damn Hot"
Alec Head: Bridge rap on "Killin' Me"
Old Man Mose: Vocalization on "Brown Shoes"
Anita Wright, Kevin Osborne, Lenny White: Yo Nards on "Yo Nard"

Chart positions

References

External links
 
 

1985 albums
Albums produced by Marcus Miller
Albums produced by Lenny White
Manhattan Records albums
Bernard Wright albums